Erythrastrea is a genus of cnidarians belonging to the family Faviidae.

Species:

Erythrastrea flabellata 
Erythrastrea wellsi

References

Merulinidae
Scleractinia genera